Trevor Robinson may refer to:

 Trevor Robinson (footballer) (born 1984), professional footballer
 Trevor Robinson (advertising), creative director and founder of Quiet Storm, a British advertising agency
 Trevor Robinson (American football), American football player